Grk or GRK may refer to:

 Grk, Serbia
 G protein-coupled receptor kinase
 Green Rock Energy, an Australian energy company
 Grk Bijeli, a white grape variety
 Grk book series, garages
 Hellenic languages
 Royal Gendarmerie of Cambodia
 Killeen–Fort Hood Regional Airport, in Texas, United States
 Robert Gray Army Airfield